The Neutrodyne radio receiver, invented in 1922 by Louis Hazeltine, was a particular type of tuned radio frequency (TRF) receiver, in which the instability-causing inter-electrode capacitance of the triode RF tubes is cancelled out or "neutralized" to prevent parasitic oscillations which caused "squealing" or "howling" noises in the speakers of early radio sets.     In most designs, a small extra winding on each of the RF amplifiers' tuned anode coils was used to generate a small antiphase signal, which could be adjusted by special variable trim capacitors to cancel out the stray signal coupled to the grid via plate-to-grid capacitance.  The Neutrodyne circuit was popular in radio receivers until the 1930s, when it was superseded by the superheterodyne receiver.

History
The circuit was developed about 1922 by Harold Wheeler who worked in Louis Hazeltine's laboratory at Stevens Institute of Technology, so Hazeltine is usually given the credit.  The tuned radio frequency (TRF) receiver, one of the most popular radio receiver designs of the time, consisted of several tuned radio frequency (RF) amplifier stages, followed by a detector and several audio amplifier stages.  A major defect of the TRF receiver was that, due to the high interelectrode capacitance of early triode vacuum tubes, feedback within the RF amplifier stages gave them a tendency to oscillate, creating unwanted radio frequency alternating currents.  These parasitic oscillations mixed with the carrier wave in the detector, creating heterodynes (beat notes) in the audio frequency range, which were heard as annoying whistles and howls from the speaker. 

Hazeltine's innovation was to add a circuit to each radio frequency amplifier stage which fed back a small amount of energy from the plate (output) circuit to the grid (input) circuit with opposite phase to cancel ("neutralize") the feedback which was causing the oscillation.  This effectively prevented the high-pitched squeals that had plagued early radio sets.   A group of more than 20 companies known as the Independent Radio Manufacturers Association licensed the circuit from Hazeltine and manufactured "Neutrodyne" receivers throughout the 1920s.  At the time, RCA held a virtual monopoly over commercial radio receiver production due to its ownership of the rights to the Armstrong regenerative and superheterodyne circuits. The Neutrodyne ended this control, allowing competition. Compared to the technically superior superheterodyne the Neutrodyne was cheaper to build. As basically a TRF receiver, it was also considered easier for non-technical owners to use than the early superhets. After manufacture each tuned amplifier stage had to be neutralized, adjusted to cancel feedback; after this the set would not produce the parasitic oscillations which caused the objectionable noises. By 1927 some ten million of these receivers had been sold to consumers in North America.

By the 1930s, advances in vacuum tube manufacturing had yielded the tetrode, which had reduced control grid to plate (Miller) capacitance. These advances made it possible to build TRF receivers that did not need neutralization,  but also made Edwin Armstrong's superheterodyne design practical for domestic receivers.   So the TRF circuit, including the Neutrodyne, became obsolete in radio receivers and was superseded by the superheterodyne design.

The Neutrodyne neutralization technique continues to be used in other applications to suppress parasitic oscillation, such as in RF power amplifiers in radio transmitters.

See also 
Crystal Radio Receiver
Low IF Receiver
Regenerative Radio Receiver
Superheterodyne Receiver
Tuned Radio Frequency Receiver

References

External links
Louis Alan Hazeltine "Scanning the Past" the Proceedings of the IEEE Vol. 81, No. 4, April 1993
Neutralisation of Philco Neutrodyne-Plus Receivers
The Neutrodyne circuit

Radio electronics
History of radio
Receiver (radio)